The 2011 Sun Life Financial Invitational Curling Classic was held from November 17 to 21 at the Brantford Golf and Country Club and Brant Curling Club in Brantford, Ontario and the Paris Curling Club in Paris, Ontario. It was held during Week 12 of the 2011–12 World Curling Tour season. The total purse for both the men's and women's events was CAD$50,000.

Men

Teams

Knockout results

A event

B event

C event

Playoffs

Women

Teams

Knockout results

A event

B event

C event

Playoffs

References

External links

Sun Life Classic
Sun Life Classic
Sport in Brantford
Curling in Ontario